San Pasquale may refer to:
 San Pasquale (Naples Metro)
 San Pasquale, a fictional country in Commander in Chief episodes

See also
 Paschal (disambiguation)
 San Pasqual (disambiguation)